2018 ACC tournament may refer to:

 2018 ACC men's basketball tournament
 2018 ACC women's basketball tournament
 2018 ACC men's soccer tournament
 2018 ACC women's soccer tournament
 2018 Atlantic Coast Conference baseball tournament
 2018 Atlantic Coast Conference softball tournament